Chiara Pierobon (21 January 1993 – 1 August 2015) was an Italian professional racing cyclist. She died from a suspected pulmonary embolism. Pierobon was travelling with her team  to the Sparkassen Giro in Germany when she fell ill. Prior to her death during the 2015 season, she came in seventh at the Giro del Trentino Alto Adige-Südtirol and ninth at the Durango-Durango Emakumeen Saria.

See also

References

External links
 
 

1993 births
2015 deaths
Italian female cyclists
Cyclists from the Metropolitan City of Venice
People from Mirano
Deaths from pulmonary embolism